Noura bint Faisal Al Saud (born 1988) is founder of the Saudi Fashion Week. She is a great granddaughter of King Abdulaziz, founder of Saudi Arabia.

Biography
Noura bint Faisal received a master's degree from Rikkyo University in Tokyo in the field of international business. She announced the launch of the first official Saudi Fashion Week under the patronage of the General Culture Authority.

References

External links

Noura
Noura
Noura
1988 births
Living people
Noura
Noura
Noura
Noura
Noura